The Shi Qiang pan (史墻盤; "Basin of Scribe Qiang"), also called the Qiang pan, is an ancient Chinese bronze pan vessel (basin). Dated to the end of the 10th century BCE, it is inscribed with a text that has been described as "the first conscious attempt in China to write history."

Low and round with two handles, the vessel is 16.2 cm tall, with a diameter of 47.3 cm. Its exterior is cast with a taotie design. It is regarded as a national treasure, and in 2002 it was listed as one of sixty-four cultural relics prohibited from leaving Chinese soil. The basin is kept at the Baoji Bronze Ware Museum.

History
The Shi Qiang pan was cast sometime during the reign of King Gong of Zhou (r. 917/15 to 900 BC) for a member of the Wēi clan (𢼸, modern 微), whose name was Qiáng. Some time later it was buried along with over 100 other vessels belonging to the family, and only unearthed in 1976, in Fufeng County, Baoji, Shaanxi.

Inscription

The interior of the vessel is inscribed with 284 characters divided into eighteen lines. The content praises the previous and current rulers of the Zhou state, extolling their virtues and deeds, and then recounts the history of the family of the caster, culminating with Scribe Qiang himself. This is in contrast to most inscriptions which detail only immediate events.

The inscription recounts how King Wen of Zhou "joined the ten thousand states", King Wu of Zhou "campaigned through the four quarters", King Zhao of Zhou "tamed Chu and Jing". In all the inscription records the virtues and highlights of the first seven Zhou kings. Slightly before the midpoint of the passage, the inscription begins describing the caster's own family, beginning with how his high ancestor had been moved from a more eastern location to the Zhou homeland at the time of the conquest of Shang by Zhou. The account touches on such subjects as the appropriateness of Qiang's grandfather's sacrifices, as well as the agricultural success of Qiang's father.

The language of the inscription is difficult both graphically and lexically. Transcriptions are available, but most are incomplete due to font constraints. The fullest treatment can be found in Shirakawa's Complete Explanations of Bronze Inscriptions. Edward Shaughnessy has translated the passage into English.

The hagiographical intent of the inscription is demonstrated by positive spin on historical fact: the inscription claims King Zhao "tamed Chu and Jing", while in reality the campaign was defeated and the king killed, within living memory of the casting of the vessel.

Notes

References

External links
Inscription of the Shi Qiang pan - English translation from the Columbia University

Zhou dynasty bronzeware
History of Baoji
1976 archaeological discoveries